The Indo-Tibetan Border Police (ITBP) is a border patrol organization of India deployed along its borders with Tibet Autonomous Region. It is one of the seven Central Armed Police Forces, established in 1962 in the aftermath of the Sino-Indian War of 1962.

In September 1996, the Parliament of India enacted the "Indo-Tibetan Border Police Force Act, 1992"  to "provide for the constitution and regulation" of the ITBP "for ensuring the security of the borders of India and for matters connected therewith".  The first head of the ITBP,  designated Inspector General, was Balbir Singh, a police officer previously belonging to the Intelligence Bureau. The ITBP, which started with 4 battalions, has, since restructuring in 1978, undergone expansion to a force of 60 Battalions with 15 Sectors and 05 Frontiers as of 2018 with a sanctioned strength of 89,432.

The ITBP is trained in the Civil Medical Camp, disaster management, and nuclear, biological and chemical disasters. ITBP personnel have been deployed abroad in UN peacekeeping missions in Bosnia and Herzegovina, Kosovo, Sierra Leone, Haiti, Western Sahara, Sudan, Afghanistan, and elsewhere. Two battalions of ITBP are deputed to National Disaster Response Force.

Command Control superstructure 
ITBP, for the first two decades since its raising in 1962, until 1983, was headed by Inspector Generals of Police (IGs), all drawn from the IPS. In this period (1963–83), IGs had stable tenures, for instance B Chatterjee, IG, was head of the force from 02 to 06–1964 to 31-08-1974, and R N Sheopory, as IG, was head from 03 to 09–1974 to 22-12-1980. In 1983, the Indira Gandhi led Congress Government, upgraded ITBP head to Director General (DG). Since  then, there has exponentially expansion of higher ranks, accompanied by volatility in the tenures of the head of ITBP. Instead of one IG as in 1983, ITBP now has 16 DG/IGs, and over 40 DIGs. The average tenure of DGs is about a year plus, and in some cases barely a few weeks, for instance B.B. Nandy, IPS, was DG (10-01-1997 to 03-04-1997), for just 28 weeks. Going by the trend of short tenures of DGs, it would appear that the Government is not overly concerned about command control, or in maintaining command continuity in the ITBP. The post of DG was again upgraded by the Manmohan Singh led UPA Government in 2008.

More than a year after the central government sanctioned raising of two commands of ITBP, the commands are now operationalised. ITBP shall have two commands one each at Chandigarh and Guwahati head by a cadre officer of ADG rank. Manoj Rawat, presently IG with ITBP HQ has been entrusted with the responsibility of raising the ITBP's Western Command at Chandigarh.

ITBP Chiefs

Roles 
ITBP is a multi-dimensional force which primarily has 5 functions:
 Vigil on the northern borders, detection and prevention of border violations, and promotion of the sense of security among the local populace. 
 Check illegal immigration and trans-border smuggling.
 Provide security to sensitive installations and threatened VIPs
 Restore and preserve order in any area in the event of a disturbance.
 To maintain peace.

Presently, battalions dog  of ITBP are deployed on border guard duties from Karakoram Pass in Ladakh to Diphu La in Arunachal Pradesh, covering 3,488  km of the India-China border. ITBP is a mountain trained force and most of the officers & men are professionally trained mountaineers and skiers. The force is under an expansion plan in order to provide relief to its troops from constant deployment in high altitude areas under the dynamic and professional leadership of Subhash Goswami, IPS.
 The border posts patrolled by ITBP are exposed to high velocity storms, snow blizzards, avalanches, and landslides, besides the hazards of high altitude and extreme cold, where the temperature dips up to minus 40-degree Celsius. ITBP conducts Long Range and Short Range patrols to keep an effective vigil on inaccessible and uninhabited areas on the border.
 The ITBP has recently taken on a disaster management role. Being the first responder for natural Disaster in Himalayas, ITBP was the first to establish 06 (now 08) Regional Response Centres in Himachal Pradesh, Uttarakhand and Northeast India and carried out numerous rescue and relief operations in various disaster situations, which took place in our areas of responsibility as well as other parts of the country.  ITBP has already trained 1032 personnel in Disaster Management including 98 personnel in Radiological and Chemical and Biological emergencies.
 ITBP has established a National Centre for Training in Search, Rescue & Disaster response at Bhanu, Haryana which is imparting training to personnel of ITBP and other Paramilitary / State Police Forces.  There is also a training centre for the Dogs at Basic Training centre situated at Bhanu.  The centre is known as NICD.
 ITBP Commando units provide security to the Embassy and consulates of India in Afghanistan. Besides this two Companies of the ITBP are providing security in Afghanistan.
 One company of ITBP is deployed in United Nation Mission in Congo since November 2005. A National Centre for UNCIVPOL training has been set up at ITBP Camp, Tigri, Khanpur, Delhi for providing systematic training to Indian Police Officers for deployment in UN Mission.
 ITBP is also providing security to the pilgrims during Annual Kailash Mansarovar Yatra from 1981. ITBP provides communication, security and medical cover to the yatries from Gunji to Lipulekh Pass and back to Gunji in co-ordination with MEA and Kumaon Mandal Vikas Nigam.
ITBP had provided Quarantine camp at Chhawala in New Delhi for the suspected persons during the COVID-19 pandemic who were evacuated from Wuhan. It had also set up camps at its other locations in the country for further quarantine.
The ITBP is also credited to run the world's largest Sardar Patel Covid Care Centre SPCCC, Radha Soami Beas, Chhatarpur, New Delhi when it treated corona patients during the 1st, 2nd and 3rd waves of deadly corona virus at the National Capital. 

ITBP's major training centre is located at Mussoorie, in Uttarakhand. The Training Academy has been established in 1976 and imparts training to Officers of the force. The training programme to Suboridnate Officers of the force are conducted at Central Training College Alwar and Basic Training College, Bhanu (Haryana). Specialised training programmes in rock craft, explosives handling etc. are also conducted here. Ace mountaineer and Padma Shri awardee, Harbhajan Singh, IG heads this institution. Keeping in view the evolving security scenario of the country, ITBP established a Counter Insurgency and Jungle Warfare(CIJW) School at an altitude of 6,000 feet in the heart of extremely tough Himalayan mountains, at Mahidanda in Uttarkashi district. The CIJW school (NOT the same as the premier CIJWS of the Indian Army) provides training to ITBP's men and officers in anti-Naxal Operations. Jungle warfare, handling of explosives, rock craft, survival in adverse conditions, unarmed combat, and guerrilla warfare are some of the subjects trained here. On account of demands to realistic Anti naxal training the CIJW School of ITBP was shifted to Belgaum Karnataka

The training regime, formulated under the close supervision of Rajiv Mehta, IPS and executed on the ground by Sanjeev Raina, DIG is extremely demanding both mentally and physically, needing special preparation.
The presence of the force along the Indo China border where it maintains vigil along the extremely difficult high altitude border area. The troops of the force keep a sharp eye on any violation of the border, trans-border smuggling, and affords a sense of security to the remotely located isolated settlements. The altitude where the troops are deployed range up to 18,800 feet and the temperature plummets to minus 30 degrees during winter with snowfall of more than ten feet.

The force is synonymous with adventure and dare-devilry and has undertaken numerous mountaineering expeditions. Its skiers have been national champions, who have competed winter Olympics. Its river rafters have created international history in rafting through the turbulent white waters of the mighty Brahmaputra, the Indus and the Ganges.  The Force has created a milestone by becoming the first Central Para Military Force to grab up the Best Marching Contingent Trophy in the Republic Day parades in 1998, 1999, 2000 and 2011. It broke new ground in 1998 when it sent the first-ever police tableau of the country to participate in the Republic Day Parade.  ITBP is at the forefront of a movement for the preservation of Himalayan environment and ecology.  ITBP has taken up in a big way the task of greening the Himalayan regions especially in Inner Himalayas.  Being the only human presence in areas close to China border, it has taken on itself the task of maintaining the delicate balance of flora and fauna.

ITBP being deployed in mountains has developed the expertise in rescue & relief operations in mountains, which entail different specialised skills of a very high standard. It is always first in extending rescue & relief in case of natural calamity. ITBP conducts a large number of civic action programmes in the remote border and terrorist affected areas to provide free and expert medical, health and hygiene care to the civilian population in remote villages.

As of June 2004, the Academy has trained 3,785 GOs, 7,776 SOs and 27,476 Other Ranks from ITBP and CPOs/ State Police Forces.

Training centres 

ITBP training centres develop amongst the trainees the qualities of: professional skills, esprit de corps and leadership. They are taught the values of integrity, impartiality and respect for all castes, creeds and religions.
Maintaining the highest tradition of supreme sacrifice in the service of motherland the Himveers are also taught to function effectively while always keeping in mind human rights and the codes of war which always guide their conduct.

The Basic Training Centre at Bhanu, Haryana ITBP Academy at Mussourie, and the Mountaineering & Skiing Institute at Auli run the training programmes and conduct indoor and outdoor training activities, in pursuance of this mission.

ITBP has undergone a massive expansion plan to provide much needed relief to its troops who remain deployed in the tough high altitude terrain for most part of their service. 13 units were raised in the year 2006–07, followed by another 7 units the following year.

Personnel of veterinary wing of ITBP are  trained in "Yak handling and Management", at ICAR-National Research Institute on Yak. Yaks are used by ITBP for transportation and logistics.

ITBP is building a full-fledged recreation and training centre in Belgaum at Halbhavi. Belgaum provides the best climate for recreation and ITBP will relocate the personal and will have large family bases in Belgaum for its soldiers after high altitude stress.

The motto of the ITBP, Shaurya, dridata, karm nishtha (Valour, determination, devotion to duty) has always inspired its men in accepting challenges to bring glory to the nation and honour to the force.

Education and Stress Counselling Services in ITBP 
ITBP is the only Central Armed Police Force in India, which has combatised stress counsellors in its Field units, Formations Including the Ranks - Deputy Commandants ESC, Assistant Commandant-ESC, Inspector-ESC, Sub Inspector-ESC and Head Constable-ESC. These uniformed stress counsellors also play a major role in improving education for ITBP wards and the local children near ITBP Units. There are 21 ITBP Public Schools across the country run by ESC personnel of ITBPolice Force.

ITBP Schools are located at remote areas like Arunachal Pradesh, Assam, Leh and Sonipat, Dwarka Delhi.

Community activities 
The ITBP organize an ice-hockey team which is considered one of the strongest in the country with many of its players also participating in the national team. The team have won the Indian Ice Hockey Championship on at least three occasions, most recently in 2019.

ITBP also conducts civic action programmes and Border Area Development Programmes for development of local population in the border areas and areas where the Force is deployed.

Himveer Wives' Welfare Association (HWWA) 
Himveer Wives' Welfare Association is a welfare wing of the Indo-Tibetan Border Police (ITBP). It is a non-profit organisation that works for the spouse, children or any dependents of ITBP personnel. It is registered under the Societies Registration Act, 1860. The association aims to rehabilitate battle casualties and widows of those who are killed in action in the line of duty. Other than that, the association organises vocational training and empowers the beneficiaries. There are more than 88,000 members in the association. The association also works for the welfare of local population in the remote Himalayan region. The formal registration of the family welfare organization of ITBP named "Himveer Wives' Welfare Association" was done on 19 May, 1998 in New Delhi. Its motto is ‘Development through active involvement’. It organises annual exhibitions to showcase rare products of Himalayan region, the profit of which is used for welfare of the families of ITBP. It also honors Veer Naris (War Widows) on special occasions and provides them assistance when needed. It organises its Raising Day every year and announces various welfare programmes for its members as well as conducts training programs.

Fatalities 
 Assistant Commandant Ashok Kumar Rana was killed in 1998 at Chirwar, in the state of Jammu and Kashmir, in an encounter with terrorists in jammu and Kashmir.
 Deputy Commandant Joy Lal, HC Khajan Singh, HC Shamsher Singh,& CT Kailash Chand were killed in a land mine blast.
 Inspector Raj Kumar was killed in 1997 in an encounter terrorist in  Wangam in  Jammu and Kashmir, and was posthumously decorated.
 Constable Suresh Kumar was killed in December 1994 in an encounter with terrorists in Jammu and Kashmir, and was posthumously decorated.
 Constable Kishan Ram killed in March 1994 in an encounter with terrorists in District Anantnag in the state of Jammu and Kashmir, and was posthumously decorated.
 Three members of the ITBP were also killed in an attempt to climb Mount Everest during a severe storm in 1996.
 CT Ajay Pathania and Roop Singh were killed  during 2008 bombing of Indian embassy in Kabul. Both  have been honoured with Kirti Chakra on 15 August 2008.
 Six ITBP personnel were killed during rescue operations in flood hit Uttarakhand when the Mi-17V5 helicopter of IAF crashed due to bad weather in 2013.

Honours and decorations 
In the course of active duties, the force has earned a number of civil and service honours, and decorations.

See also 
 Assam Rifles
 Border outpost
 Border Security Force
 Central Industrial Security Force
 Central Reserve Police Force
 Indo-Tibetan Border Police (Water Wing)
 Ministry of Home Affairs
 National Security Guard
 Sashastra Seema Bal

References

External links 

 ITBP website

1962 establishments in India
Border guarding forces of India
Government agencies established in 1962
Paramilitary forces of India
Federal law enforcement agencies of India
China–India border